Michał Zygmunt Ruciak (born 22 August 1983) is a Polish former professional volleyball player. He was part of the Polish national team in 2004–2014, a participant at the Olympic Games London 2012, the 2009 European Champion and the 2012 World League winner.

Personal life
Michał Ruciak was born in Świnoujście, Poland. On 22 September 2007 he married Justyna (née Terlecka). They have two sons: Rafał (born on 2 June 2008) and Filip (born on 18 March 2011). In 2014 they split up. In 2016 he married Paulina. In April 2018 they revealed they are expecting their first child.

Career

Clubs
He began to play with Maraton Świnoujście, later moving to Morze Szczecin, Skra Bełchatów and AZS Olsztyn. In 2008 moved to ZAKSA Kędzierzyn-Koźle. After 7 seasons in ZAKSA Kędzierzyn-Koźle, he left this club in April 2015.

National team
Michał Ruciak was in the Polish squad when the Polish national team won the gold medal of European Championship 2009. On September 14, 2009 he was awarded Knight's Cross of Polonia Restituta. The Order was conferred on the following day by the Prime Minister of Poland, Donald Tusk. He won with Polish team three medals in 2011 - silver at World Cup and two bronzes at World League and European Championship. He is a gold medalist of World League 2012 in Sofia, Bulgaria.

Honours

Clubs
 CEV Cup
  2010/2011 – with ZAKSA Kędzierzyn-Koźle
 National championships
 2004/2005  Polish Championship, with AZS Olsztyn
 2010/2011  Polish Championship, with ZAKSA Kędzierzyn-Koźle
 2012/2013  Polish Cup, with ZAKSA Kędzierzyn-Koźle
 2012/2013  Polish Championship, with ZAKSA Kędzierzyn-Koźle
 2013/2014  Polish Cup, with ZAKSA Kędzierzyn-Koźle

Youth national team
 2003  FIVB U21 World Championship

Individual awards
 2013: Polish Cup – Best Server
 2014: Polish Cup – Best Receiver

State awards
 2009:  Knight's Cross of Polonia Restituta

References

External links

 
 Player profile at PlusLiga.pl 
 Player profile at Volleybox.net

1983 births
Living people
People from Świnoujście
Sportspeople from West Pomeranian Voivodeship
Polish men's volleyball players
Olympic volleyball players of Poland
Volleyball players at the 2012 Summer Olympics
Knights of the Order of Polonia Restituta
Skra Bełchatów players
AZS Olsztyn players
ZAKSA Kędzierzyn-Koźle players
BKS Visła Bydgoszcz players
Czarni Radom players
Stal Nysa players
Outside hitters
Liberos